Pablo De Miguel Postigo was a Spanish footballer who played as a forward. The dates of his birth and death are unknown. Born in Madrid, he was a member of the Madrid national team that won the 1917 Prince of Asturias Cup, an inter-regional competition organized by the RFEF. The tournament coincided with the 1917 Copa del Rey Final between Madrid FC and Arenas, which prevented the Madrid national side from using the Madrid FC players, including his brother Antonio De Miguel, who played for Madrid FC at the time, and so, the Spanish capital had to call the "second options", and against all odds they won the tournament for the first time in Madrid's history, thus doing what the "first options" had failed to. Pablo only played in one game, helping his side to a 3-2 win over Cantabric.

Honours

International
Madrid XI
Prince of Asturias Cup:
Champions (1): 1917

References

Date of birth unknown
Date of death unknown
Footballers from Madrid
Spanish footballers
Association football forwards